Holly Mai (born Holly Mann, 23 December 1991) is a British actress based in Buckinghamshire. She is best known for her portrayal of Sammy Lee in Grange Hill since 2005.

Holly used her original name during her first series, but is believed to have changed it to avoid confusion with another Holly Mann, who appears in the Harry Potter films. Holly is represented by Linton Management in London.

External links
 Holly Mai Star File at Grange Hill Online

1991 births
Living people